Scott and Roberts Dry Cleaning Plant, Office, and Store is a historic dry cleaning plant, office, and store located at Durham, Durham County, North Carolina. It was built in 1947, and is a one-story, three bay Moderne brick building on a partial concrete basement.  It features a projecting center bay, plate-glass storefront windows, and a centered front entrance with original glass-block entrance surround.

It was listed on the National Register of Historic Places in 2012.

References

Dry cleaning
Industrial buildings and structures on the National Register of Historic Places in North Carolina
Moderne architecture in North Carolina
Industrial buildings completed in 1947
Buildings and structures in Durham, North Carolina
National Register of Historic Places in Durham County, North Carolina